Ross John Anderson   (born 15 September 1956) is a researcher, author, and industry consultant in security engineering. He is Professor of Security Engineering at the Department of Computer Science and Technology, University of Cambridge where he is part of the University's security group.

Education
Anderson was educated at the High School of Glasgow. In 1978, he graduated with a Bachelor of Arts in mathematics and natural science from the University of Cambridge where he was an undergraduate student of Trinity College, Cambridge, and subsequently received a qualification in computer engineering. Anderson worked in the avionics and banking industry before moving back to the University of Cambridge in 1992, to work on his doctorate under the supervision of Roger Needham and start his career as an academic researcher. He received his PhD in 1995, and became a lecturer in the same year.

Research and career

Anderson's research interests are in security, cryptology, dependability and technology policy. In cryptography, he designed with Eli Biham the BEAR, LION and Tiger cryptographic primitives, and co-wrote with Biham and Lars Knudsen the block cipher Serpent, one of the finalists in the Advanced Encryption Standard (AES) competition. He has also discovered weaknesses in the FISH cipher and designed the stream cipher Pike.

Anderson has always campaigned for computer security to be studied in a wider social context. Many of his writings emphasise the human, social, and political dimension of security. On online voting, for example, he writes "When you move from voting in person to voting at home (whether by post, by phone or over the internet) it vastly expands the scope for vote buying and coercion", making the point that it's not just a question of whether the encryption can be cracked.

In 1998, Anderson founded the Foundation for Information Policy Research, a think tank and lobbying group on information-technology policy.

Anderson is also a founder of the UK-Crypto mailing list and the economics of security research domain.

He is well-known among Cambridge academics as an outspoken defender of academic freedoms, intellectual property and other matters of university politics. He is engaged in the "Campaign for Cambridge Freedoms" and has been an elected member of Cambridge University Council since 2002. In January 2004, the student newspaper Varsity declared Anderson to be Cambridge University's "most powerful person".

In 2002, he became an outspoken critic of trusted computing proposals, in particular Microsoft's Palladium operating system vision.

Anderson's TCPA FAQ has been characterised by IBM TC researcher David R. Safford as "full of technical errors" and of "presenting speculation as fact."

For years Anderson has been arguing that by their nature large databases will never be free of abuse by breaches of security. He has said that if a large system is designed for ease of access it becomes insecure; if made watertight it becomes impossible to use. This is sometimes known as Anderson's Rule.

Anderson is the author of Security Engineering, published by Wiley in 2001. He was the founder and editor of Computer and Communications Security Reviews.
After the vast Global surveillance disclosure leaked by Edward Snowden beginning in June 2013 Anderson suggested one way to begin stamping out the British state's unaccountable involvement in this NSA spying scandal is to entirely end the domestic secret services. Anderson: "Were I a legislator, I would simply abolish MI5". Anderson notes the only way this kind of systemic data collection has been made possible was through the business models of private industry. The value of information-driven web companies such as Facebook and Google is built around their ability to gather vast tracts of data. It was something the intelligence agencies would have struggled with alone.

Anderson is a critic of smart meters, writing that there are various privacy and energy security concerns.

Awards and honours
Anderson was elected a Fellow of the Royal Society (FRS) in 2009. His nomination reads: 

Anderson was also elected a Fellow of the Royal Academy of Engineering (FREng) in 2009. He is a fellow of Churchill College, Cambridge.

References

British technology writers
Modern cryptographers
Fellows of the Institute of Physics
Fellows of Churchill College, Cambridge
Computer security academics
Copyright scholars
Alumni of Trinity College, Cambridge
Members of the University of Cambridge Computer Laboratory
Living people
Fellows of the Royal Society
1956 births
People from Sandy, Bedfordshire